Kevi Lee Luper (born July 6, 1990) is an American women's college basketball player at Oral Roberts University. Luper was born in Tahlequah, Oklahoma. She graduated from Adair High School. She led the NCAA Division I in points and steals in season 2010–11.

She competed for the United States women's national basketball team at the 2011 Pan American Games.

College statistics
Source

See also
 List of NCAA Division I women's basketball career steals leaders

References

External links 
 Oral Roberts profile

1990 births
Living people
People from Tahlequah, Oklahoma
American women's basketball players
Basketball players from Oklahoma
Guards (basketball)
Basketball players at the 2011 Pan American Games
Pan American Games competitors for the United States
21st-century American women